Gertrude Langer (née Froeschel) (1908–1984) was Austrian-born art critic in Brisbane, Queensland, Australia. She was prominent in the Queensland Art Gallery and other arts organisations.

Life in Austria
Gertrude Froeschel was born in Vienna, Austria in 1908. She commenced study in the History of Art at Vienna University in 1926 being taught by Professor Josef Strzygowski and later attended lectures by Henri Focillon at the Sorbonne. In 1932 she married a fellow student Karl Langer graduating the following year on the same night as he with a Doctorate of Philosophy in Art History. In 1938 before the annexation of Austria by the Third Reich, Gertrude who was Jewish, and Karl left Vienna and travelled via Athens to Australia.

Life in Australia
Karl and Gertrude arrived in Sydney in May 1939 proceeding to Brisbane in July so that Karl could commence work for architects Cook and Kerrison. From the time of their arrival until their deaths the Langers dedicated themselves to a great variety of civic and professional activities. Their combined efforts greatly influenced the development of the arts and design in Queensland especially through such organisations as the Queensland Art Gallery Society, the Australian Council for the Arts and the Vacation Schools of Creative Art in which they fulfilled key roles over many years.

Gertrude was the art critic for The Courier Mail from 1953 until her death, her last review being published on the day she died, 19 September 1984. She was a foundation member of the International Association of Art Critics and was president of the Association's Australian Division from 1975 to 1978. Through her work with the Gallery Society and her personal donations of art works including drawings by Karl she exerted her influence on the collection of the Queensland Art Gallery.

Their home, Langer House, in St Lucia was designed by her husband Karl. The house was sold after the death of Gertrude Langer in 1984. It is listed on the Queensland Heritage Register.

Honours
She was made an Officer of the Order of the British Empire by The Queen on 1 January 1968 for her services as President of the Arts Council of Queensland.

Works
Her works included a book of poems for her late husband Karl:

References

Attribution

Further reading
 

1908 births
1984 deaths
20th-century Australian journalists
20th-century Australian women writers
Australian art critics
Australian women journalists
Austrian art critics
Austrian journalists
Austrian women journalists
Jewish Australian writers
Jewish women writers
Jewish emigrants from Austria to Australia after the Anschluss
Writers from Brisbane
Writers from Vienna
Australian women art critics
University of Vienna alumni
Australian Members of the Order of the British Empire
Articles incorporating text from the Queensland Heritage Register